George Saunders Rideout (born 2 January 1945 in Moncton, New Brunswick) was a member of the House of Commons of Canada from 1988 to 1997. He was also the mayor of Moncton from 1983 to 1988. During his tenure as mayor, he laid the groundwork for Moncton's ascension as a regional hub of economic activity.

The son of two former federal Members of Parliament, Sherwood Rideout and Margaret Rideout, he was a lawyer by career, in practice with Stewart & Stratton and later Rideout & Robinson. Stepping down as mayor in 1988, he won election for the Liberal party that year and in the following elections in 1993, representing the Moncton electoral district. Rideout thus served in the 34th and 35th Canadian Parliaments and in doing so, gave the Rideout family the distinction of being one of the few in Canada to have three separate family members to hold the same riding.

Rideout did not seek a third term in Parliament and left federal politics in 1997. Shortly afterwards, he was appointed to the Court of Queen's Bench of New Brunswick. He is still serving in that position.

Electoral history

References

External links
 

1945 births
Living people
Liberal Party of Canada MPs
Members of the House of Commons of Canada from New Brunswick
Mayors of Moncton
Judges in New Brunswick